Jeffrey William Pentland (born September 8, 1946) is an American baseball coach. He has coached in college baseball and Major League Baseball

Playing career
Pentland attended Arizona State University (ASU) and played college baseball for the Arizona State Sun Devils.  As a pitcher for ASU, he had a 32-12 win–loss record in his career and his 2.25 earned run average still ranks as one of the top 10 in ASU history. He was on the 1967 College World Series baseball team. He spent three seasons (1969–71) in the San Diego Padres minor league system, mostly playing first base but also pitching in 29 games.

In 2002, Pentland was inducted into the ASU Hall of Fame.

Coaching career
Pentland worked as an assistant coach at University of California, Riverside, from 1975 through 1982 and at Arizona State from 1983 through 1992. He then joined the minor league coaching staff of the Florida Marlins in 1993 and became their Major League hitting coach for the second half of 1996.

Pentland later worked as the hitting coach for the Chicago Cubs (–), Kansas City Royals (–), and Seattle Mariners (–).

He was hired by the Los Angeles Dodgers in 2008 as a secondary hitting instructor and was promoted to hitting coach in 2010. He was fired on July 20, 2011.

On January 11, 2015, Pentland was hired by the New York Yankees to take over as their hitting coach, replacing long-time hitting coach Kevin Long. The Yankees declined to offer him a contract following the season.

Personal
Pentland resides in Tempe, Arizona.

References

External links

1946 births
Living people
Arizona State Sun Devils baseball players
Chicago Cubs coaches
Elmira Pioneers players
Florida Marlins coaches
Kansas City Royals coaches
Lodi Padres players
Los Angeles Dodgers coaches
Major League Baseball hitting coaches
Miami Marlins scouts
New York Yankees coaches
People from Hollywood, Los Angeles
Sportspeople from Tempe, Arizona
Salt Lake City Bees players
Seattle Mariners coaches
Arizona Instructional League Pilots players